Kurtis may refer to:

People
Bill Kurtis, American television journalist
Frank Kurtis (1908–1987), American car-builder and founder of Kurtis Kraft
Mesut Kurtis, Macedonian Islamic singer of Turkish descent
Kurtis Conner, American comedian and YouTuber
Kurtis Rowe, New Zealand Rugby League player
Kurtis Blow, American Rapper

Fictional characters
Kurtis Trent from the Tomb Raider: The Angel of Darkness game
Kurtis, a recurring character in the Disgaea: Hour of Darkness and Disgaea 2: Cursed Memories games
Kurtis Stryker from the Mortal Kombat series of video games

See also 
Curtis (disambiguation) (includes Curtiss)
Kurti (disambiguation)